"Panic on the Streets of Springfield" is the 19th episode of the thirty-second season of the American animated television series The Simpsons, and the 703rd episode overall. It aired in the United States on Fox on April 18, 2021. The episode was directed by Matthew Nastuk, and written by Tim Long. In this episode, Lisa becomes obsessed with a cynical English singer named Quilloughby (based on Morrissey and voiced by Benedict Cumberbatch) who becomes her imaginary friend. The episode was dedicated in memory of Edwin E. Aguilar, an animator, character layout and assistant director of The Simpsons who died on April 11, 2021.

Plot
Homer is to be prescribed a drug by Dr. Hibbert for his low testosterone, but when he sees a preview commercial for a high-torque truck, he buys that instead. The truck comes with a subscription to a music streaming service. Its algorithm recommends that Lisa listen to The Snuffs, a band fronted by Quilloughby (parodies of Morrissey and The Smiths).

Lisa is inspired by Quilloughby's veganism and gets vegan tacos on the school menu, but they are mistakenly made with bacon. Disgusted, she finds solace from the singer in the form of an imaginary friend in Quilloughby's young, progressive guise who gives her witty retorts to Bart and her teachers. A concerned Principal Skinner calls Homer and Marge to school. Marge then cancels Lisa's music subscription.

The imaginary singer advises Lisa to steal Homer's credit card to afford entry to a music festival, where the real Quilloughby is performing. She tires of the imaginary singer's cynicism and both are shocked to see that the real one is now an overweight bigot who has anti-immigrant views and has abandoned veganism. When the real Quilloughby is booed and chased off stage, Lisa has one final conversation with the imaginary singer, who advises her to not let what befell his real-life counterpart happen to her. Homer and Marge find Lisa amidst the riot, who worries about her future as a teenager, and save her.

During the credits, Marge sees the similarity between Lisa's behavior and her own rebellious phase against her mother. She comforts Lisa and reassures her she will always be there for her.

Production
Morrissey turned down an offer to play himself in "The Regina Monologues", a Britain-based episode of the 15th season of The Simpsons. According to writer Tim Long, the "Morrissey-esque" Quilloughby character is also based on other British singers, including Robert Smith of The Cure and Ian Curtis of Joy Division. The episode's original music was composed by Bret McKenzie of the New Zealand duo Flight of the Conchords.

Cultural references
The episode's title parodies the lyrics to the Smiths' song "Panic", while the character Quilloughby sings "Hamburger Homicide", a parody of their song "Meat Is Murder". The band also has a song called "How Late is Then?", similar to "How Soon Is Now?" and another called "What Difference Do I Make?", similar to "What Difference Does It Make?" A tree is labeled as Shel Silverstein's Giving Tree, a reference to the author's book. The imaginary younger Quilloughby believes that his real, older self looks like Winston Churchill.

Reception

Critical reception
Tony Sokol of Den of Geek gave the episode 4 stars out of 5, saying "My head hangs heavy with the pain of laughter". He praised the parody of Morrissey and Spotify.

John Schwarz of the animation website Bubbleblabber gave the episode 5 out of 10. He found it off-putting that Lisa's hallucinations seemed to resemble serious mental illness, and disliked the new voice of Dr Hibbert, Kevin Michael Richardson.

Reaction from Morrissey
The episode was criticized by Peter Katsis, the manager of British singer-songwriter Morrissey, upon whom the Quilloughby character is at least partially based. He called The Simpsons "hurtful and racist," referencing Hank Azaria's apology earlier in the week to people of Indian heritage for his longtime portrayal of Apu Nahasapeemapetilon. He was particularly upset by the depiction of the older Quilloughby as overweight and meat-eating, while the real Morrissey remains vegan. Morrissey himself wrote that the depiction was "taunting" a lawsuit, but he did not have the means to legally challenge it, adding "in a world obsessed with Hate Laws, there are none that protect me". Katsis believed that The Simpsons staff said that the character was based on several people, so that Morrissey could not sue. He also was critical of the character's voice actor, Benedict Cumberbatch; "Could he be that hard up for cash that he would agree to bad rap another artist that harshly?".

Some media pundits, such as Ed Power of The Daily Telegraph and Diamond Rodrigue of the Dallas Observer, believed that Morrissey was overreacting to the episode; the latter said that he should have been happy to be portrayed in popular culture again. Conversely, Armond White of the National Review called the episode a "character assassination" and said that it joined in with social media campaigns to "cancel" Morrissey. Writing in The Irish Times, Finn McRedmond found "pleasant symmetry" in how a series he considered to have passed its best was attacking a singer he thought of in the same way.

References

External links
 

2021 American television episodes
The Simpsons (season 32) episodes
Morrissey
Television episodes about vegetarianism
Animation controversies in television
Television controversies in the United States